The Piano Concerto in C minor, Op. 12, is a three-movement composition for piano and orchestra by French composer Gabriel Pierné.  The piece was completed in early 1887, shortly after Pierné returned to Paris from a three year stay in Rome.

Composition
Lasting roughly twenty minutes in performance, the concerto is composed in three movements:
Allegro
Scherzando
Final

Style and influences
The concerto has been compared to the music of fellow French composer Camille Saint-Saëns, specifically his Piano Concerto No. 2 in G minor.  In the CD liner notes to conductor Juanjo Mena's recording of the Piano Concerto with the BBC Philharmonic, music critic Gerald Larner expanded on the Saint-Saëns comparison, saying:

However, the work has also been suggested by Larner and BBC Music Magazine critic Christopher Dingle as inspiration for the works of Sergei Rachmaninoff.  Larner commented, "It is remarkable more for its anticipation of Rachmaninoff, who comes to mind again in the main 'Allegro deciso,' not in the first theme but when the piano introduces the splendid E-flat-major melody which is to dominate the middle section of the movement and inspire its broad central climax."

Instrumentation
The work is scored for solo piano and an orchestra consisting of two flutes, two oboes, two clarinets, two bassoons, four French horns, two trumpets, three trombones, timpani, tambour, and strings (violins I & II, violas, violoncellos, and double basses).

Reception
Despite noting comparisons to Saint-Saëns, Bryce Morrison of Gramophone said the piece had "a scintillating character of its own" and specifically praised the second movement, saying, "Only a puritan could resist the second-movement 'Scherzando,' where a jaunty theme is sent spinning through a maze of sparkling Christmas-tree elaboration."  In the All Music Guide to Classical Music, Adrian Corleonis likened the work to Pierné's own Fantaisie-ballet for Piano and Orchestra (1885), commenting, "If not great music, it is well made, often spurred by robust gaiety, and of engaging freshness."  Corleonis added, "...[they] are imposing examples, their mock seriousness yielding to caressing lyricism."

Conversely, Andrew Clements of The Guardian called the work "a curiously bombastic mix of Saint-Saëns and Tchaikovsky" and added "I find its winsomeness hard to take, though others might be more tolerant."

References

Bibliography

Compositions by Gabriel Pierné
1887 compositions
Pierné
Compositions in C minor